KWKY (1150 kHz) is an AM radio station broadcasting a Catholic talk and teaching format.  Its city of license is Des Moines, Iowa, and is owned by Saint Gabriel Communications.  Most of the schedule is nationally syndicated shows from EWTN Radio and Ave Maria Radio.

KWKY broadcasts by day at 2,500 watts.  But to avoid interfering with other stations on AM 1150, it reduces power at night to 1,000 watts and uses a directional antenna at all times.  The station is also heard on FM translator station K233BT 94.5 MHz in Des Moines.

1150 AM is a Regional broadcast frequency.

History

KWDM
The station signed on the airwaves as KWDM in 1948.  The station was part of a trio of new stations that signed on that year in Des Moines which included  940 KIOA (now KPSZ) and 1390 KCBC (now 1700 KBGG).  The owner of KWDM was George Webber, who set up studios at 407 Fifth Avenue.  Webber had an extensive musical library and KWDM was known for its eclectic mix of international music not heard elsewhere in Des Moines.  The call sign stood for Webber and Des Moines.

The station was never a huge ratings success, but had a devoted and loyal following of people who enjoyed their programming.  In 1959 Webber sold the station to the 3M Corporation.  He would later bring KWDM back on the air in 1964 as an FM station, at 93.3 MHz (now KIOA).

Top 40 KWKY
Once 3M completed its purchase of KWDM the switched the call sign to KWKY.  The station began 48 hours of stunting by playing Earl Brown's novelty record Pachalafaka for two days with a countdown to "Quickie" and the legal ID of "KWDM Des Moines" inserted in between the song.  KWKY station management also attempted to purchase commercial time on 1460 KSO and 940 KIOA to announce that "Quickie is coming."  Once the stunting was done, KWKY was introduced as "Quickie 1150" with a new Top 40 format.

Going up against two well established Top 40 stations with much stronger signals larger coverage areas was not a successful decision.  In 1960, KWKY adopted a Middle of the Road format similar to KCBC.  In 1961, KWKY tried a Top 40 format again with similar results to the first attempt.

Country music
In 1962 the format was again changed, this time to country music.  This marked the fifth format change in three years.  It was with this format that KWKY would reach its highest levels of ratings success.  KWKY dominated the country market for the next ten years, as the only full time AM country station in Des Moines.

The decline of KWKY started in 1972 when 1460 KSO switched from Top 40 to Country Music.  With KSO's higher power and better coverage area, KWKY's complicated directional antenna pattern hurt it in the ratings.  KWKY tried to compete for the next 4 years. But in the end, 3M decided to sell the station to the Putbrese Family in 1976.

Christian radio
After the Putbrese family purchased KWKY the format was switched to an Evangelical Christian talk and teaching format along with some high school sports.  KWKY became a brokered-time station, with national and local religious leaders buying segments of time on the station, during which they could ask listeners for financial support for their ministries.

A fire in 1977 caused $70,000 worth of damages to KWKY's Norwalk studios.  After 30 years of Evangelical Christian programming, a local group of Catholic business and religious leaders purchased the station through a non-profit corporation, Saint Gabriel Communications.  While the station still broadcasts religious programming, it is now targeted towards Catholic listeners.

References

External links

FCC History Cards for KWKY

Radio stations established in 1948
1948 establishments in Iowa
WKY